This is a list of musical bands from the country of Iceland.

For listing of singers from Iceland, see List of Icelandic singers.

For singer-songwriters from Iceland, see List of singer-songwriters#Iceland



0-9
 200.000 naglbítar

A
 ADHD
 Agent Fresco
 Amiina
 Ampop
 Apparat Organ Quartet
 Árstíðir

B
 Bang Gang
 Benny Crespo's Gang
 Borko

C
 Changer

D
 Dead Skeletons
 Dikta
 Dimma

E
 Egó
 Elektra
 Eurobandið

F
 Feldberg
 FM Belfast
 For a Minor Reflection
 Fræbbblarnir

G
 Grýlurnar
 GusGus

H
 Hatari

I
 Ingó og Veðurguðirnir

J
 Jagúar
 Jakobínarína
 JFDR
 Júníus Meyvant
 Just Another Snake Cult

K
 Kukl
 Klassart
 kimono
 Kaleo
 Kiasmos

L
 Leaves

M
 Mammút
 Mezzoforte
 Merzedes Club
 Mínus
 Misþyrming
 Mugison
 Múm

N
 Nylon

O
 Of Monsters and Men

P
 Pollapönk

Q
 Quarashi

R
 Retro Stefson
 Reykjavíkurdætur
 Rökkurró

S
 Sálin hans Jóns míns
 Samaris
 Seabear
 Sin Fang
 Sign
 Sigur Rós
 Singapore Sling
 Ske
 Skálmöld
 Slowblow
 Sóley
 Sólstafir
 The Sugarcubes
 Stafrænn Hákon
 Steed Lord
 Stuðmenn
 Sykur
 Systur

T
 Thor's Hammer
 Trabant
 Trúbrot
 The Vintage Caravan

V
 Valdimar
 The Vintage Caravan
 Vök

Þ
 Þeyr
 Þursaflokkurinn

References

Bands

Iceland